Vancouver General Hospital (locally known as VGH, or Vancouver General) is a medical facility located in Vancouver, British Columbia. It is the largest facility in the Vancouver Hospital and Health Sciences Centre (VHHSC) group of medical facilities. VGH is Canada's third largest hospital by bed count, after Hamilton General Hospital, and Foothills Medical Centre.

Vancouver Coastal Health (VCH) is responsible for all operations at Vancouver General Hospital.

History
The Canadian Pacific Railway (CPR) first opened in 1886 a nine-bed tent, its primary use to treat railway workers. On June 13, 1886, a fire destroyed the tent hospital and by July, a new, one-storey building was built. In September, the City of Vancouver took over the facility, which became the City Hospital. In 1888, located at the southern edge of the original Gastown settlement, a 35-bed hospital opened, as the tent infirmary became too small. The upstairs ward was for female patients, the downstairs ward for males. In 1899, the Vancouver City Hospital Training School for Nurses was opened. In 1902, British Columbia provincial legislature transferred control from the city's board of health to a board of 15 directors. Vancouver City Hospital was renamed to Vancouver General Hospital.

In 1906, in Fairview Ridge, overlooking False Creek, a new building, the Heather Pavilion, began housing staff and patients. The University of British Columbia Medical School opened clinical facilities at VGH in 1950.

In 1959, VGH opened the "Centennial Pavilion" (named in commemoration of the centennial of the founding of British Columbia as a British Crown colony, in 1858), which at the time was the largest part of the VGH facilities.

In the 1960s, VGH build Canada's first intensive care nursery, equipped with the first effective apparatus used for natural breathing in infants with respiratory failure.

In 1996, VGH opened the first three floors of its newly constructed Laurel Pavilion. In 2000, the Laurel Pavilion was renamed to the Jim Pattison Pavilion and construction of the final 12 floors began in 2001. The Jim Pattison Pavilion opened in 2003.

In 2004, ground-breaking for the new Gordon and Leslie Diamond Health Care Centre began. This new building, adjacent to the Jim Pattison Pavilion, opened in August 2006 to provide acute day care services in a variety of areas.

The Lung Centre specializes in the treatment of pulmonary conditions such as asthma, emphysema, chronic bronchitis, bronchiectasis, lung cancer, occupational and environmental lung diseases, sarcoidosis, pneumonia, tuberculosis, pulmonary hypertension and interstitial lung disease.

The Blusson Spinal Cord Centre, the world's largest, most advanced and most comprehensive facility devoted to spinal cord injury research and patient care was opened in November 2008. The six-storey, $45-million centre is home to ICORD (International Collaboration on Repair Discoveries), the Rick Hansen Institute and the Brenda and Davide McLean Integrated Spine Clinic and is a partnership of the University of British Columbia, the Rick Hansen Foundation, Vancouver Coastal Health Research Institute, and the VGH & UBC Hospital Foundation.

The Robert H.N. Ho Research Centre, opened in September 2011, is a seven-storey,  facility that houses three of VGH's key research programs: the Vancouver Prostate Centre at VGH; the Centre for Hip Health and Mobility; and the Ovarian Cancer Research Initiative.

Facilities and amenities

VGH is the largest hospital in British Columbia, offering specialized and tertiary services to adult patients (18 and above) in Vancouver. The hospital accepts patients referred from other parts of the province requiring highly specialized services. Approximately 40% of the hospital's cases come from outside the Vancouver region. Vancouver General Hospital is an internal medicine hospital, with pediatric and maternal care services in the Vancouver region being offered by BC Children's Hospital and BC Women's Hospital & Health Centre, located roughly 2.5 km south of Vancouver General.

In addition to providing specialized and tertiary medical services, VGH is also a teaching hospital in affiliation with the University of British Columbia Faculty of Medicine, providing training and advanced education to students from all disciplines. Unique in Canada is the Gordon and Leslie Diamond Health Care Centre at VGH which includes the UBC Faculty of Medicine facilities. The facility houses teaching space for about 250 third and fourth year medical students and 500 postgraduate residents, and nine Faculty of Medicine programs as well as the UBC medical school library.

VGH's main cafeteria, Sassafras Cafeteria, is located on the second floor of the Jim Pattison Pavilion. The pavilion also has a café at its main entrance called Café Ami.

Facts and figures
 One emergency department
 24 operating rooms
 40 outpatient clinics
 27,400 inpatient (overnight) visits per year
 294,300 clinic visits per year
 94,348 emergency department visits per year (15/16 fiscal)
 23,000 outpatient and inpatient surgical cases per year

Divisions
 Respiratory Medicine and Thoracic Surgery
 Alzheimer Clinic
 BC Injury Prevention Centre
 Centre for Cardiac Rehabilitation and Risk Factor Management
 Domestic Violence
 Eye Care Centre, established in 1983 with funds raised with the help of Stephen M. Drance
 Leukemia/Bone Marrow Transplant Program
 Mary Pack Arthritis Centre
 Trauma Services/Orthopedic Trauma Service
 Outpatient Psychiatry Clinic
 CIBC Centre for Patients and Families
 Vancouver Prostate Centre
 Short Term Assessment and Treatment Centre (STAT)
 Skin Care Centre
 Work Adjustment Program
 Vancouver Coastal Health Research Institute
 Centre for Hip Health

Emergency Room documentary series

In 2014, Knowledge Network premiered "Emergency Room: Life + Death at VGH" a six-part documentary series directed by Kevin Eastwood which follows several VGH emergency department staff and patients over a period of 80 days between February and May 2013. The series won twice at the 2014 Leo Awards, taking home Best Documentary Series and the People's Choice Award for Favourite TV Series.

The second season of Emergency Room: Life + Death at VGH began on April 12, 2016.

Notable deaths
Errol Flynn, Australian-American actor

References

External links

 Vancouver Coastal Health
 Vancouver General Hospital (VGH) Research Pavilion
 VGH & UBC Hospital Foundation

Hospital buildings completed in 1886
Hospital buildings completed in 1959
Hospitals in British Columbia
University of British Columbia
Buildings and structures in Vancouver
Hospitals established in 1906
Heliports in Canada
Certified airports in British Columbia
1906 establishments in British Columbia